Terapia d'urgenza is an Italian television series.

Cast

 Rodolfo Corsato: Riccardo Malosti
 Antonella Fattori: Cristiana Gandini
 Cesare Bocci: Sergio Danieli
 Simone Borrelli: Mauro Morbello
 Milena Miconi: Laura Costa
 Sergio Muniz: Nicola Palumbo
 Daniela Scarlatti: Giulia Graziosi
 Marco Basile: Valerio Santamaria
 Alessia Barela: Marina Ranieri Del Colle
 Max Pisu: Rocco Cannizzaro
 Elisabetta Rocchetti: Esther Bruno

See also
List of Italian television series

External links
 

Italian medical television series
2008 Italian television series debuts
2009 Italian television series endings
RAI original programming